Stepan Savelevich Guryev (1 August 1902 - 22 April 1945) was a Soviet Red Army officer and major-general in World War II who led the 5th Airborne Corps, which was reformed into the 39th Guards Rifle Division in August 1942 and fought at Stalingrad.

Biography 

Appointed commander of the 16th Guards Rifle Corps in 1944, he led the Corps into East Prussia and the Battle of Königsberg.

The general was killed in action at Pillau (today Baltiysk) on 22 April 1945, three days after being awarded the honorary title of Hero of the Soviet Union by the Presidium of the Supreme Soviet of the USSR.

The city Guryevsk in the Russian Federation's Kaliningrad Oblast is named after him.

References

External links
 Brief biography 

1902 births
1945 deaths
People from Lipetsk Oblast
People from Lipetsky Uyezd
Soviet major generals
Soviet military personnel killed in World War II
Heroes of the Soviet Union
Recipients of the Order of the Red Banner
Recipients of the Order of Kutuzov, 2nd class